Euzora costalis is a moth of the subfamily Lymantriinae first described by Frederic Moore in 1879. It is found in Sikkim, India.

References

Moths described in 1879
Lymantriinae